This is a list of episodes from the second season of Real Time with Bill Maher.

Note that the Iraq War, President George W. Bush (from 2003 to 2009), and current/upcoming elections are frequent topics on the show and may not be listed under individual episodes.

Episodes

External links 
 Real Time with Bill Maher Free (audio-only) episodes & Overtime podcast direct from HBO
 HBO.com Episode List
 TV.com Episode Guide
 

Real Time with Bill Maher
Real Time with Bill Maher seasons